Anvaya refers to the logical connection of words, as to how different words relate with each other to convey a significant meaning or idea. Literally, Anvaya (Sanskrit: अन्वय) means - positive; affirmative or nexus; but in grammar and logic this word refers to -  'concordance' or 'agreement', such as the agreement which exists between two things that are present, as between 'smoke' and 'fire', it is universally known that - "where there is smoke, there is fire". However, this word is commonly used in Sanskrit grammar and logic along with the word, Vyatireka, which means - agreement in absence between two things, such as absence of 'smoke' and 'fire' - "where there is no smoke, there is no fire". Anvaya-vyatireka, is the term used by the Buddhists and Hindu logicians as a dual procedure -  to signify 'separation' and 'connection', and to indicate a type of inference in which hetu (reason) is co-present or is co-absent with sādhya (major term), as the pair of positive and negative instantiations which represent the inductive and the deductive reasoning, both.

Causal Logic

The terms Anvaya and Vyatireka are used to establish the meaningfulness of 'components'; these terms are also used to ascribe individual meanings to 'components'; 'instrumentality' (prāmānaya), 'efficacy' and 'place of purpose' (artha) are the 'crucial components' in the process of knowing. The process of knowing involves the concurrent occurrence (anvaya) of a certain meaning vis-a-vis a certain linguistic unit, and identifying the absence of a certain meaning vis-a-vis a unit, which effort results in the understanding of a certain specified meaning depending upon the presence of a given 'root' or 'stem' or 'suffix'.  With any one of these three essentials taken away or replaced the original meaning is no longer understood or in its place some other meaning arises in the mind of the hearer. This is so because a relationship holds firmly between the evidence and the property to be confirmed. And, the use of concepts and notions requires a notion of sameness not difference; the fact of 'repeatability', 'distribution' or 'continuity' in respect of 'cognition' of things indicates multiple instances of their presence or absence or the very expectation of what is to be obtained or avoided. Even that which can be qualified by a negation has anvaya. Dharmakirti is of the view that for the construction of the sameness required by anvaya certain limits (avadhis) are required to be placed on the causes and effects which are the foci, and which cannot be without some notion of sameness.

Advaita Vedanta’s interpretation and application

In Advaita, this causal logic is used for distinguishing the atman from the 'non-atman' or  anatman , for confirming the Śruti sayings about the atman because it works against the concept of the invariable presence of the witness of all cognitive acts, acts to the possible absence of its objects. Shankara holds that immediately after the hearing of a sacred scripture (shravana) from his Guru the disciple can rely in his own ascent on the four values that prepare the ground for the arousal of the 'desire to know Brahman'. The all-pervasiveness of the Absolute is anvaya which is the invariable factor that has to be differentiated from the causal body or the five sheaths enveloped in which (subjected to avidya) the self forgets its real nature and becomes subjected to transmigration. Therefore, Vidyaranya in his Panchadasi (I.37)  explains that by differentiating the Atman from the causal body or the five sheaths through the method of distinguishing between the variable presence of the Self (when the Self persisting in all states but the subtle body is not perceived in deep sleep), and the invariable presence (anvaya) of the Self (pure consciousness persisting in both the waking and dream states), one can draw out one’s own Atman from the five sheaths and attain the supreme Brahman, and that:-

सुषुप्त्यभाने भानन्तु समाधावात्मनोऽन्वयः |
व्यतिरेकस्त्वात्मभाने सुषुप्तय्यनवभासनम् ||
suṣuptyabhānē bhānantu samādhāvātmanō̕nvayaḥ |
vyatirēkastvātmabhānē suṣuptayyanavabhāsanam ||

" Avidya  (manifested as the causal body or bliss sheath) is negated in the state of deep meditation (in which neither subject nor object is experienced), but the Atman (Self) persists in that state; so it is the invariable factor. But the causal body is a variable factor, for though the Atman persists, it does not. " (Panchadasi I.41)

In this context Swami Swahananda drawing attention to Katha Upanishad VI.17 and Shvetashvatara Upanishad III.13 reminds us that (quote) - "though the flowers in a garland are different, the thread passing through them is one and unchanging. Atman is like that thread" (end of quote). The analogy presented by the Bhagavata Purana (II.ix.35) indicates that when the atman  is in the body in the waking states etc., means that the cause is inside the effects as the invariable factor (anvaya).

Anvaya also refers to the construed text.

References

Vedas
Vedanta
Buddhist logic
Sanskrit words and phrases